Unimicron Technology Corporation (Unimicron) is a printed circuit board (PCB) manufacturer headquartered in Taiwan. The company produces PCBs, high density interconnection (HDI) boards, flexible PCBs, rigid flex PCBs, integrated circuit (IC) carriers, and others. In addition, it provides testing and burn-in services of IC substrates and PCBs. Applications of its products and services include liquid crystal display (LCD) monitors, personal computers (PCs) and peripheral products, notebook computers, network cards, facsimile machines, scanners, mobile phones, personal digital assistants (PDAs), and others. Unimicron has manufacturing sites and/or service centers in Taiwan, China, Germany, and Japan.

Overview
Unimicron,  a subsidiary of United Microelectronics Corporation, started in 1990, grew to global rank of 6th in 2006, and became global No. 1 in the PCB industry in 2009 and 2010. Unimicron arrived at a second position in the 2012 global PCB market with a market share of 3.7% and $2.4 billion in revenue.

References

External links
Official Website
PCB Assembly

1990 establishments in Taiwan
Companies based in Taoyuan City
Electronics companies established in 1990
Printed circuit board manufacturing